Talbot Merton Smith (born September 27, 1933) is an American former professional baseball executive who has served in high baseball operations positions—including general manager and club president—as well as the founder of a firm that advises Major League Baseball teams on salary arbitration cases.

A veteran of 54 years in baseball, he most recently served as president of baseball operations for the Houston Astros from November 22, 1994, through November 27, 2011—completing his 35th season with the Astros over three separate terms; he received a lifetime achievement award in 2005. He is the father of baseball executive Randy Smith.

Early Colt .45s/Astros career
Tal Smith was born in Framingham, Massachusetts. After attending Culver Military Academy and Duke University, serving in the United States Air Force, and a brief time as a sportswriter, he began his baseball career in the front office of the Cincinnati Reds as a protégé of Gabe Paul, their general manager from 1951–1960. He moved with Paul to Houston when the Astros were founded (as the Colt .45s) at the close of the 1960 baseball campaign. While Paul stayed only a few months in Texas before resigning to return to Ohio as front-office boss of the Cleveland Indians, Smith remained with Houston as the team's farm system director, then assistant to the president. He was promoted to vice president, player personnel after the 1965 season.

When Paul surfaced as a member of George Steinbrenner's syndicate, which purchased the New York Yankees early in 1973, he hired Smith away from the Astros as executive vice president and head of the Yankees' baseball operations department. Smith spent  seasons as a key part of the management team that built the Yankees back into a league power. But when the chance came to become the general manager of the Astros on August 7, 1975, Smith accepted it.

Return to Houston as general manager
Houston was in last place in the National League West Division when Smith assumed the reins, but under his leadership, the team rebuilt itself into contenders, winning its first division title in 1980. Along the way, Smith was named team president in 1976 and played a key role in resolving the club's ownership problem when he helped to convince Dr. John McMullen, a limited partner in Steinbrenner's ownership group, to sell his Yankees' shares and become the owner of the Astros.

However, in a move that shocked baseball, McMullen fired Smith only days after the team's successful 1980 season; McMullen went so far as to call Smith a "despicable human being". The move angered fans and partners.  In fact, some of the Astros limited partners threatened a lawsuit and brought about a re-organization with the result that two other directors ended up on equal footing with McMullen. The Astros made the playoffs in 1981 before experiencing a slide that did not end until 1986.

Rather than seeking another front-office job, Smith formed his own consulting firm named Tal Smith Enterprises to advise MLB clubs on how best to handle salary arbitration cases with their players. His firm became extremely successful over the next 15 years.

Third term in Astros' front office
In November 1994, Smith returned to the Astros (under the club's then-owner Drayton McLane, Jr.) as president of business operations. On August 27, 2007, Smith was named acting GM after the firing of Tim Purpura. He re-assumed his previous position upon the appointment of Ed Wade as full-time GM on September 21, 2007.  Both Wade and Smith were dismissed by the team's new owner, Houston businessman Jim Crane, when he assumed control of the Astros late in November 2011. According to news reports at the time, Smith still heads Tal Smith Enterprises.

Smith was a vital aide to McLane in the design of the Astros' ballpark, Minute Maid Park. The ballpark's field dimensions and unique angles were designed with Smith's input and assistance. Until the 2017 season, center field included a 30-degree hill named "Tal's Hill" as a tribute to his creativity and contribution to the Minute Maid Park project. Smith had a similar role in the construction of the Astros' first stadium, the Astrodome, in 1963 when he was assistant to the president of the Houston Sports Association. The Astrodome changed the face of stadiums and the city of Houston. When the natural grass failed to thrive under the Astrodome's roof, Smith was responsible for finding an alternative playing surface. This led to the installation of Astroturf, a synthetic turf that became widely used in stadiums throughout the country.

Honors 
On January 27, 2022, it was announced that Smith would be elected to the Houston Astros Hall of Fame.

References

External links
Tal Smith at Baseball America Executive Database

1933 births
Living people
Baseball people from Massachusetts
Cincinnati Reds executives
Culver Academies alumni
Duke University alumni
Houston Astros executives
Major League Baseball executives
Major League Baseball farm directors
Major League Baseball general managers
Major League Baseball team presidents
Military personnel from Massachusetts
New York Yankees executives
Sportspeople from Framingham, Massachusetts